BSG may refer to:

Places
 Bata Airport (IATA airport code: BSG), the second largest airport in Equatorial Guinea
 Besitang station (rail station code BSG), North Sumatra, Sumatra Island, Indonesia; see List of railway stations in Indonesia
 Bibliothèque Sainte-Geneviève, a library in Paris, France
 Bournemouth School for Girls, a grammar school located in Bournemouth, Dorset, England, UK
 British School of Guangzhou. Baiyun, Guangzhou, Guangdong, China

Arts and entertainment
 Battlestar Galactica, an American science fiction franchise created by Glen A. Larson
 Battlestar Galactica (1978 TV series), an American sci-fi television series
 Battlestar Galactica (2004 TV series), a military sci-fi serial drama television series
 Beacon Street Girls, a tween book series by Annie Bryant
 Bering Sea Gold, a reality TV Alaska sea mining show
 Back Street Girls, a Japanese manga series by Jasmine Gyuh
 Birtles Shorrock Goble, an Australian pop/rock group
 Brendon Small's Galaktikon, the solo album debut by Brendon Small
 British Comedy Guide (formerly British Sitcom Guide), a website about British comedy

Organizations
 Base Service Group, a type of unit of the Nigerian Air Force
 Naval Criminal Investigative Service Behavioral Science Group
 Betriebssportgemeinschaft, an organizational form of sports clubs in East Germany
 The Bharat Scouts and Guides, national scouting and guiding association of India
 Bharat Soka Gakkai, Indian wing of Soka Gakkai International
 British Society for Geomorphology, the professional organisation for British geomorphologists
 British Society of Gastroenterology, a British professional organisation of gastroenterologists and associates
 SUNY Brockport Student Government (BSG)
 Brotherhood of Saint Gregory, a community of friars within the Anglican communion
 Federal Social Court, a German federal court of appeals for cases under social jurisdiction

Other uses
 Basigin, a protein that in humans is encoded by the BSG gene
 Bashkardi language (ISO 639 language code: bsg)
 Blue supergiant, supergiant stars of spectral type O or B
 Borosilicate glass, a type of glass with the main glass-forming constituents silica and boron oxide
 Brewers’ spent grain
 Belt Starter Generator, for vehicles mild hybrid

See also

 
 BGS (disambiguation)
 GBS (disambiguation)
 GSB (disambiguation)
 SBG (disambiguation)
 SGB (disambiguation)